Melvin Lyle Frederick (November 24, 1929 – August 19, 2019) was an American politician and businessman.

Frederick was born in West Concord, Minnesota. He graduated from the West Concord High School in 1947. Frederick then served in the United States Army during the Korean War. He was involved in the grocery business and was the owner of Fredeick's Super Valu in West Concord. Frederick was also a stock broker. Frederick served in the Minnesota Senate from 1971 to 1990 and was a Republican. Frederick died from cancer at St. Mary's Hospital in Rochester, Minnesota.

Notes

External links

1929 births
2019 deaths
People from Dodge County, Minnesota
Military personnel from Minnesota
Businesspeople from Minnesota
Republican Party Minnesota state senators
Deaths from cancer in Minnesota
20th-century American businesspeople